During World War II Nazi Germany developed rocket technology that was more advanced than that of the Allies  and a race commenced between the Soviet Union and the United States to capture and exploit the technology. Soviet rocket specialist were sent to Germany in 1945 to obtain V-2 rockets and worked with German specialists in Germany and later in the Soviet Union to understand and replicate the rocket technology. The involvement of German scientists and engineers was an essential catalyst to early Soviet efforts. In 1945 and 1946 the use of German expertise was invaluable in reducing the time needed to master the intricacies of the V-2 rocket, establishing production of the R-1 rocket and enable a base for further developments. However, after 1947 the Soviets made very little use of German specialists and their influence on the future Soviet space program was marginal.

Background

During WWII Nazi Germany developed the world's first long range Liquid-propellant rockets known as the V-2, with the technical name A4.  The missile was developed as a "vengeance weapon" and assigned to attack Allied cities as retaliation for the Allied bombings against German cities. The  rocket also became the first artificial object to travel into space by crossing the Kármán line with the vertical launch of MW 18014 on 20 June 1944.

The V-2 rocket was far more advanced than any rocket developed by the Allies.  Prior to 1945 the United Kingdom, United States and Soviet Union had not developed a rocket with a thrust greater than 1.5 metric tons, whilst the V-2's thrust was up to 27 metric tons. A race commenced between the Allies, particularly United States and Soviets, to acquire the technology behind the V-2 and similar weapons developed by Nazi Germany.

At the end of WWII the Soviet Union had been devastated by Nazi Germany, with 27 million people killed, 1,700 cities destroyed and agriculture production reduced to famine proportions.
At the Yalta Conference Winston Churchill, Franklin D. Roosevelt, and Joseph Stalin agreed that war reparations were payable by Nazi Germany in the form of equipment, goods and German labour, with the Roosevelt and Stalin agreeing to an amount of $20 Billion, with 50% ($10 Billion) going to the Soviet Union. The Soviets, United States and to a lesser extent British and France all seized "intellectual"  repatriations from Germany. The dismantling of German industry also ensured the complete disarmanent of its war potential, as agreed at the Potsdam Conference.

Soviet rocket development prior to 1945

Rocketry in the Soviet Union began in 1921 with extensive work at the Gas Dynamics Laboratory (GDL), which was merged with the Group for the Study of Reactive Motion (GIRD), lead by Sergey Korolev, in 1933 to form the Reactive Scientific Research Institute (RNII). This well-funded and staffed laboratory created the Katyusha rocket launcher and built over 100 experimental rocket engines under the direction of Valentin Glushko. Design work included regenerative cooling, hypergolic propellant ignition, and swirling and bi-propellant mixing fuel injectors. During the 1930s Soviet rocket technology was comparable to Germany's, but Joseph Stalin's Great Purge severely damaged its progress, with Korolev, Glushko and many other leading engineers imprisoned in the Gulag.

The Soviet Union was first informed of the Nazi Germany's rocket programme in July 1944 by Winston Churchill, who appealed directly to Stalin to inspect a missile test station in Debica, Poland which was about to be overrun by advancing Soviet forces. British and Soviet personnel inspected the site and recovered A-4 missile parts, which were sent to London via Moscow. Whilst in Moscow the parts were inspected by several members of the Soviet rocket design bureau RNII.

Work in Germany

Institut Rabe and Institut Nordhausen

In early 1945 a team of Soviet rocket specialists were sent to Germany to identify and recover German rocket technology. The first Soviet team to arrive at Nordhausen, the main V-2 construction site, were disappointed, United States teams had already removed approximately 100 completed V-2 missiles and destroyed what remained. In addition, the majority of the German rocket engineers had surrendered to the United States, including a large quantity of documents relating to rocket technology.

Soviet search teams did locate V-2 parts at Nordhausen, Lehesten (test site for rocket engines) and other locations in the Thuringia area. Therefore, a Soviet missile research group based in Bleicherode was created in July 1945 led by Boris Chertok and called Institut RABE that recruited and employed German rocket specialists to work with Soviet engineers for restoring a working V-2 rocket flight control system. The Institut RABE was also created with the purpose of retrieving German rocket specialists from the United States Occupation zone. As an early success in August 1945 Chertok recruited Helmut Gröttrup (the deputy for the electrical system and missile control at Peenemünde, also assistant to Ernst Steinhoff) from American territory, along with his family, and offered him founding the Büro Gröttrup  in parallel to the Institut RABE.

In February 1946 the Institute RABE and Büro Gröttrup were absorbed into the larger Institut Nordhausen, which had the goal of recreating the entire German A-4 rocket. It was headed by Korolew as the Chief Engineer and Gröttrup as the German head. In May 1946, the Institute Nordhausen, Institute Berlin (reconstructing the Wasserfall missile) and several manufacturing sites in Thuringia (until 1945 part of the Mittelwerk supply) were combined into the Zentralwerke. By October 1946, Zentralwerke employed 733 Soviet specialists, and between 5,000 and 7,000 Germans, including Korolev as Chief Engineer, Glushko as head of Engine assembly and propulsion systems and Gröttrup as General Director.

Operation Osoaviakhim

On the 13 May 1946 USSR Council of Ministers Decree No 1017-419 'Questions on Reactive Armaments' was signed by Stalin, which established the future strategy and direction for Soviet rocketry. Among the detailed requirements was that work in Germany would end in late 1946 with Soviet and German personnel transferred to Soviet locations. Therefore, the most capable German rocket scientists and engineers were identified, and on 22 October, 152 personnel and their families (a total of 495 persons) were deported to the Soviet Union as part of Operation Osoaviakhim together with more than 2,000 other German specialists. According to another source, 2,552 German specialists together with 4,008 family members were relocated to the USSR, 302 of them having knowledge in rocketry, thereof 198 from the Zentralwerke.

Work in the USSR

On arrival the 302 Germans were split into several groups. A large group of 99 specialists from the Zentralwerke was installed in Podlipki in the north east section of Moscow as part of Korolev's NII-88, 76 design engineers were transferred to Gorodomlya Island, and 23 specialists to Khimki as part of Glushko's OKB-456 for the development of rocket engines. The initial work included:
 "consultations for issuing a set of A4 rocket documentation in Russian, 
 compiling diagrams of the A4 and surface-toair guided missile research laboratories, 
 studying issues related to boosting the A4 rocket engine, 
 developing the design for an engine with a thrust of 100 tons, and 
 preparing to assemble rockets that were made of German parts and had been outfitted with equipment at the Institute Nordhausen".

The ministry for production of telecommunications assigned another group of 43 German scientists to assist NII-885 under Nikolay Pilyugin for developing gyroscopic guidance control systems.

While located in the Soviet Union the German specialists received fairly high wages and good conditions, which were mainly based on their qualifications. For example, Gröttrup was paid 4,500 roubles per month and his family were housed in a six-room villa and provided with a chauffeured vehicle. The minimum wage received for a German specialist was 4,000 roubles per month, plus all Germans were entitled to performance bonuses. As a comparison, Chertok, the former head of Institute Rabe and now Deputy Chief Engineer and Head of department for guidance systems, who also now supervised the German specialists working on control systems, received a salary of 3,000 rubles per month and his family lived in two rooms of a communal four-room apartment.

The first Soviet tests of V-2 rockets took place in October 1947 at Kapustin Yar. 13 German engineers participated in the tests, among them Helmut Gröttrup, Johannes Hoch, Kurt Magnus, Fritz Viebach, Hans Vilter, Waldemar Wolff. The first two rockets were successfully launched and flew for approximately 200 km, however they deviated 30 km and 180 km from their intended target. The German specialist Magnus and Hoch were instrumental in resolving the issue, which was an existing problem with the V-2 rockets recovered from Germany. For resolving the issue all the German specialist were each rewarded with a large 15,000 ruble bonus.

In June 1947 the German team in NII-88, led by Gröttrup, proposed the development of an improved copy of the V-2, which he called the G-1 (called the R-10 in Soviet terms). This plan, whilst supported by senior Soviet management, was opposed by Soviet engineers, particularly by Korolev, who was now Chief Designer of long-range ballistic missiles. Korolev had simultaneously and independently commenced work on an improved Soviet copy of the V-2, that was designated the R-2. Korolev also opposed utilising German specialist for personal reasons and basically ignored their suggestions and advice.

Glushko, who was now Chief Designer of liquid-propellant rocket engines in OKB-456, utilised German expertise for mastering and improving the existing V-2 engine, internally called RD-100 (copy of V-2) and RD-101 (used for R-1) with a thrust of up to 267 kN. Further German ideas for increased thrust helped Glusko to develop RD-103 for the R-5 Pobeda with a thrust of 432 kN (500 tons) and higher efficiency. However once this was accomplished Glushko no longer needed their expertise. Due to political and security concerns, German specialists were not allowed knowledge or access to any Soviet missile design. Therefore, once the Soviets had mastered understanding and production of the V-2 rocket in 1946–47, all German specialists were excluded from Soviet developments. Their work was conducted independently, including work on the G-1, which proceeded as a "draft plan".

Until early 1948 all German specialists working in Podlipki were transferred to Gorodomlya Island. In September 1948 test flights were carried on the R-1, the Soviet copy of the V-2 rocket, built with local materials. No German personnel were present for these tests at Kapustin Yar.

In December 1948 the updated plan for the G-1 rocket was reviewed, which the German team had improved the range and accuracy. However major work on the G-1 was terminated by senior Soviet management. A number of other studies were carried out by the German specialist between 1948 and 1950, including the G-1M, G-2, G-3, G-4 and G-5. In October 1949 Korolev and Dmitry Ustinov, the then Soviet Minister of Armaments, visited the branch of NII-88 in Gorodomlya to gather and understand German knowledge as much as possible to push the development of mid-range R-3 and R-5 Pobeda missiles. The concept of the G-4 targeted to build a long-range ballistic missile for a range of 3,000 km and a payload of 3 tons. The newly developed design scheme showed a number of changes compared to the V-2 and thus differed fundamentally from the rockets previously manufactured in the USSR. The newly chosen shape of a circular cone was intended to ensure increased aerodynamic stability so that the stabilization surfaces at the rear could be dispensed with. The position control was carried out by a swiveling engine. At the same time, the German designers paid attention to radical simplification of the overall system and consistent weight savings in order to achieve the required reliability and range.

The later studies from 1950 were limited to initial designs, including diagrams and calculations. None of these studies were officially taken up by the Soviets. From early 1951 young Soviet engineers were sent to Gorodomlya Island for training purposes. By this time most of the German specialists were spending their time playing sports, gardening or reading.

Return to Germany
By August 1950 the Soviet government had decided to send the Germans working for NII-88 home, which occurred in three waves in December 1951, June 1952 and the last group of eight, including Gröttrup, left in November 1953. By the end of 1950 a small number of Germans (among them Johannes Hoch) were transferred to Moscow and worked on activities for surface-to-air missiles.

Historical analysis
Historians have disagreed on the extent that Nazi Germany played with developing the Soviet rocket program.  Chertok, who participated in the events and documented the details in his mammoth 4 volume Rockets and People said that  the Germans had little influence and the R-7 rocket that propelled the Sputnik 1 to orbit was "free of the "birthmarks" of German rocket technology". This view is supported by German born historian of rocketry Willey Ley, who wrote "“In reality, the Germans did not build anything for the Russians, did not “supervise” the firings, and did not “introduce innovations”.

Other historians, particularly German based, have claimed that German specialists had an extensive influence on Soviet rocketry.  In particular Dr. Olaf Przybilski has pointed out similarities between later Soviet rockets and the studies carried out by German specialists, however these claims lack convincing evidence.

Asif Siddiqi, who's epic book Challenge to Apollo : the Soviet Union and the space race, 1945-1974 was rated by The Wall Street Journal as one of the best works on space exploration, takes a more balanced approach by acknowledging Nazi Germany rocket technology and involvement of German scientists and engineers was an essential catalyst to early Soviet efforts. In 1945 and 1946 the use of German expertise was invaluable in reducing the time needed to master the intricacies of the V-2, establishing production of the R-1 rocket and enabling a base for further developments. However, due to a combination of reasons, including secrecy requirements due to the military nature of the work, political considerations and personal reasons from some key players, from 1947 the Soviets made very little use of German specialists. They were effectively frozen out from ongoing research and their influence on the future Soviet space program was marginal. Siddiqi also noted a CIA report, which summed up the total German contribution as follows:
"The German scientists made a very valuable contribution to the Soviet missile program[;] however, it cannot be said that without the Germans the Soviet Union would have had no significant missile program....There is no doubt that it took the German war time success with guided missiles to cause Stalin and his colleagues to devote large scale support to the Soviet effort in this field. Once this support was forth coming the use of German scientists permitted the Soviets to achieve results in a much shorter time than it would have taken them along but there is no reason to believe that the Soviets could not have eventually done the job by themselves".

References

Sources cited 

 
 
 

Germany–Soviet Union relations
Science and technology in the Soviet Union
Space program of the Soviet Union